KPNO may refer to:

 Kitt Peak National Observatory, astronomical observatory in Arizona
 KPNO (FM), a Christian radio station in Norfolk, Nebraska, repeating the signal from KGRD in Orchard, Nebraska
 K-Pop Night Out at SXSW, original name of Korea Spotlight, an annual concert of South Korean artists held in the United States